Adrian Mikołaj Głębocki (8 September 1833, Panki - 15 May 1905, Warsaw) was a Polish painter, lithographer and art teacher.

Biography 
After completing secondary school in 1850, he studied at the School of Fine Arts in Warsaw until 1857, where his primary instructor was Rafał Hadziewicz. This was followed by studies in Paris, Vienna and Munich. After completing his studies, he worked briefly in Warsaw as a scenery painter for the set designer, Antonio Sacchetti. From 1863, he lived in  Częstochowa, where he taught at the local gymnasium. 
 
During this time, he created numerous works related to the Kalisz Region. Many of the buildings he depicted no longer exist, so his paintings have acquired great documentary value. His work includes an album of 52 watercolors of the Jasna Góra Monastery and the ceremonies there. He often accompanied his works with descriptions and commentary, and wrote several articles on the monuments of the region.

In 1873, he moved to Warsaw. He also wrote a major article about his work in Częstochowa for the literary journal  and continued teaching at a school for the deaf as well as giving private lessons.

Many of his lithographs are arranged in "cycles" on religious and historical themes. He also produced several art books for children, including some with cut-out patterns for toys.

References

Further reading 
 Aleksander Jaśkiewicz: Z regionalnej teki Adriana Głębockiego, in Nad Wartą, 1968, #1 
 Aleksander  Jaśkiewicz: Rysunki Adriana Głębockiego źródłem do poznania XIX-wiecznego stroju ludowego, in Polska Sztuka Ludowa, 1976, #1

External links 

1833 births
1905 deaths
19th-century Polish painters
19th-century Polish male artists
Genre painters
19th-century lithographers
Polish lithographers
Religious art
People from Silesian Voivodeship
Polish male painters